The men's long jump event  at the 1978 European Athletics Indoor Championships was held on 12 March in Milan.

Results

References

Long jump at the European Athletics Indoor Championships
Long